Philippe Brenninkmeyer (born 3 November 1964) is a Dutch actor. In Germany he is known as Philipp Brenninkmeyer.

Biography 

Brenninkmeyer was born in Wimbledon, London. He is a member of the German-Dutch Brenninkmeijer family which founded the clothing store chain C&A. Brenninkmeyer attended boarding schools in Brighton, Meerbusch/Düsseldorf, the Aloisiuskolleg in Bonn, and Switzerland. He then worked for C&A in Cologne before deciding to become an actor.

He studied at the William Esper Studio in New York City from 1997–1999, where he appeared in productions of Macbeth and King Lear with the Frog & Peach Theater. Brenninkmeyer worked with the theatre company "Theatre Tribe" in Los Angeles, California in 2004. He has also studied theater in London, where he performed in the title role of Woyzeck at the Etcetera Theatre.

Brenninkmeyer first achieved success in Germany with the role of hotel manager Christian Dolbien in the German television series girl friends – Freundschaft mit Herz. He has also appeared in several other German shows and telemovies, as well as had supporting roles on the American shows Sex and the City, Law & Order, and Guiding Light. For the American comedy troupe Broken Lizard, Brenninkmeyer has played a Swinging German car thief in Super Troopers, a German beer tournament referee in Beerfest and a perturbed diner in The Slammin' Salmon. Brenninkmeyer starred as an American businessman in the German-Singapore movie House of Harmony opposite the Singaporean film star Fann Wong. He also appeared in the 2008 episode "The Jet Set" of Mad Men.

The actor speaks Dutch, English, French, and German. Brenninkmeyer currently has homes in Los Angeles and Berlin (Germany) and is married to the American actress Tara Lynn Orr.

Filmography

Film

TV Series

Video Games

References 

the Internet Movie Database
Theater performances 
Brenninkmeyer's casting agency, Carola Studlar 
Profile at ZDF (17 March 2004) 
Interview at ZDF (17 March 2004) 
Talk show preview at NDR

External links 
Philippe Brenninkmeyer's Official Website

Philipp Brenninkmeyer at New-Video.de 

1964 births
Living people
Male actors from London
English male film actors
English male television actors
English male stage actors
English people of Dutch descent
English people of German descent
People from Wimbledon, London